Archibald C. Dawson ARSA (16 April 1892 – 15 April 1938) was a Scottish sculptor, specialising in architectural carving. Two of his most noteworthy works include wood and stone carvings for the University of Glasgow Memorial Chapel and sculptures for the Russell Institute in Paisley, featuring images of his wife and two sons.

Personal life and career
He was born in Hamilton, South Lanarkshire at 23 High Partick Street.

Dawson's father, Mathew Dawson, was also an architectural carver who was in partnership with the Glasgow sculptor, James Milne Sherriff (1861–1904)

From 1911 to 1913 he attended the Glasgow School of Art and received the Haldane Trust Award. In his final year, he taught stone carving. Dawson then served during World War I in the Glasgow Battalion of the Highland Light Infantry.

From about 1920 to 1938, Dawson directed the design, modelling and stone carving classes at the Glasgow School of Art. Around 1926, Dawson taught a class in bronze casting in San Diego, California's Santa Barbara School of the Arts. He became the head of the Modelling and Sculpture and Ceramics Department in 1929. Dawson was in 1936 elected Associate of the Royal Scottish Academy. The same year he became a member of The Scottish Modern Arts Association. It was at about that time he also was a partner at Dawson & Young, after first working for James Young & Son.

He married Isabell (Isa) Wharrie Nelson on 3 July 1920. They had two sons, Alistair and Hamish. They lived first at 69 Minard Street and later at 56 Kelvingrove Street.

He died on 15 April 1938, the day before his St. Andrew figure was installed for the 1938 Empire Exhibition Scottish Pavilion, also the day before what would have been his 46th birthday. He is buried in the Glasgow Necropolis in an unmarked grave.

Works

Notable works
One of his noteworthy works was the carving of stone and wood mouldings as designed by Sir John Burnett for Glasgow University's Memorial chapel, between 1923–1927. He worked on several churches by Jack Antonio Coia and the Ross Memorial Church in 1927.

Another important work was the Russell Institute in Paisley, Scotland where he created between 1927 and 1929 groups and figures in bronze and other materials. His wife and two sons were models for the large sculpture over the entrance.

Aside from his works for churches, Dawson also created the following works in Glasgow: 
 1927–1931 – Scottish Legal Life Building reliefs and heraldry
 A statue of St. Andrew that is on the exterior of what was the North British & Mercantile Building, now the Sun Alliance building. Dawson and his wife were added about 1952 by Jack Mortimer. The Dawsons represented the Seafarer and Seafarer's wife.
 1928–1929 – Industry and Shipbuilding figures on the Mercat Building
 1928–1929 – Mercat Cross at Glasgow Cross
 1930 – Heraldic Unicorn, Margaret Findlay was his model for the work.
 1933–1935 – Tennent Memorial Building
 Sculpture for other commercial buildings.
1938 – St Peter in Chains, Ardrossan,  Ayrshire, The Stations of the Cross.    Church built in 1938 by Jack Coia, Category A listed building.

His final work, created in 1938, was St. Andrew as a Young Man for the Empire Exhibition's Scottish Pavilion in Bellahouston. Due to his sudden death, the work became his memorial during the Empire Exhibition.

Other works
The following is a partial list of Dawson's works
 Head of a child
 The mask
 Mother and child
 1915 – Youth
 1919 – Portrait Study of Miss Nelson
 1923 – Ophelia
 1923 – Portrait of Miss Betty Liddell
 1924 – Kelpie
 1924 – Mark for black marble
 1925 – Benje
 1933 – Jack Antonio Coia, ARIBA
 1934 – Portrait
 1935 – Miss Margot Gardner
 1936 – Hamish Dawson Davidson
 1936 – Sketch for a garden
 1936 – Helen Elizabeth Anne Hutchison
 1937 – Viscount Andover
 1937 – James Campbell Semple
 1937 – The artist's wife
 1938 – Helen Elizabeth Anne
 1938 – Moyra Mainds

Exhibitions
Dawson exhibited his work many times from 1915 to 1939:
 The Exhibition of the Royal Scottish Academy of Painting, Sculpture and Architecture: 1924, 1925, 1933, 1934, 1935, 1936, 1937, 1938, 1939
 The Royal Glasgow Institute of the Fine Arts: 1915, 1919, 1923
 Palace of Arts Empire Exhibition Scotland: 1938

References

External links
 Charity by Archibald Dawson (1924–26)
 Sculpture – St Patrick’s RC Church, Greenock
 Stations of the Cross and keystone by Archibald Dawson, St Anne's Church, Dennistoun
http://www.s117059731.websitehome.co.uk/Golden%20Jubilee/GoldenJubileeBook.htm

1892 births
1938 deaths
Scottish sculptors
Scottish male sculptors
Modern sculptors
Highland Light Infantry soldiers
Alumni of the Glasgow School of Art
20th-century British sculptors